"Going Nowhere" is a song by English singer-songwriter Gabrielle. It was written by Gabrielle and George McFarlane and produced by Pete Cragie for Gabrielle's debut studio album, Find Your Way (1993). Released as the album's second single on 20 September 1993, it reached number nine on the UK Singles Chart and number 18 in Ireland. The song also peaked at number three on the Canadian RPM Dance/Urban chart and number 14 on the US Billboard Hot Dance Club Play chart.

Critical reception
In his weekly UK chart commentary, James Masterton wrote, "The girl and her eyepatch followup the summer's big No.1 "Dreams" with a track slightly more representative of her usual output and without the novelty value maybe not quite as big a hit." Andy Beevers from Music Week gave the song four out of five, adding, "How do you follow up a debut hit as massive as "Dreams"? Gabrielle wisely decides to stick to pretty much the same formula, delivering a distinctively sung, dead catchy song". He also noted, "However, this is no note-for-note rerun – the song is less overtly poppy than "Dreams" and Steve Jervier's production gives it a street soul edge." Tim Jeffery from the RM Dance Update described it as "a slow, soulful song aimed at the radio", and "not as innovative as "Dreams" but sure to be another hit." Tom Doyle from Smash Hits gave "Going Nowhere" two out of five, saying that "it's not nearly as catchy" as her first single.

Track listings

Charts

References

1993 singles
1993 songs
Gabrielle (singer) songs
Go! Beat singles
Songs written by Gabrielle (singer)